was a Japanese noble lady, calligrapher, poet and scholar. She was the eldest daughter of Katsunuma Nobutomo (勝沼 信友), a samurai of the Sengoku period. She lived as a nun on Daizen-ji temple at Mount Kashiwao and is most notable for her military history, Rikei-ni no Ki, or "Nun Rikei’s Account."

Influence
In 1582, the daimyō (大名) or warlord Takeda Katsuyori (武田 勝頼) rebelled against the rival Hojo clan, but because of his poor leadership skills, he was defeated by Oda Nobunaga and Tokugawa Ieyasu. He, his young formal wife, and about ninety of their followers, mostly women, fled to Rikei's nunnery. However, because of Katsuyori's failure as an administrator, no one wanted to welcome or pity this retinue.  Rikei, on the other hand, pitied their fate. She was familiar with the style of military tales, so she wrote Rikei-ni no Ki or "The Nun Rikei's Account" to honor them so that their names at least could remain.

The Rikei-ni no Ki is one of three military accounts written by women in this time period (1600s), the others being the Oan Monogatari and the Okiku Monogatari. Rikei's work starts with a description of the Takeda clan's genealogy, and then she moves into a description of the killings and ritualistic suicides that the retinue committed in order to preserve their honor and avoid capture.  She also incorporated a myougouka, or prayer verse, in her account. After describing the death of Katsuyori's formal wife, she lists seven poems. The beginning of these verses form the acrostic "na-mu-a-mi-ta-hu-tsu," which is a Buddhist prayer that translates loosely to "Glory to Amitabha" or "May they rest in peace.".

See also 

 Ono Otsū

References

1530 births
1611 deaths
Japanese women poets
Japanese women historians
16th-century Japanese women writers
16th-century Japanese writers
17th-century Japanese writers
Japanese writers of the Edo period
People of Sengoku-period Japan
Women of medieval Japan
17th-century Japanese women
Edo period Buddhist clergy